1169 Alwine, provisional designation , is a Florian asteroid from the inner regions of the asteroid belt, approximately 8 kilometers in diameter. It was discovered on 30 August 1930, by German and Italian astronomers Max Wolf and Mario Ferrero at Heidelberg Observatory in southwest Germany. Any reference of its name to a person is unknown.

Orbit and classification 

Alwine is a member of the Flora family, a giant asteroid family and the largest family of stony asteroids in the main belt. It orbits the Sun in the inner asteroid belt at a distance of 2.0–2.7 AU once every 3 years and 6 months (1,290 days; semi-major axis of 2.32 AU). Its orbit has an eccentricity of 0.15 and an inclination of 4° with respect to the ecliptic. As no precoveries were taken, and no prior identifications were made, Alwines observation arc begins with its official discovery observation at Heidelberg in August 1930.

Physical characteristics 

According to the survey carried out by NASA's Wide-field Infrared Survey Explorer with its subsequent NEOWISE mission, Alwine measures 7.89 kilometers in diameter, and its surface has an albedo of 0.179. Based on a generic magnitude-to-diameter conversion, its diameter is between 7 and 17 kilometers for an absolute magnitude of 12.8 and an albedo in the range of 0.05 to 0.25.

Lightcurve 

As of 2017, no rotational lightcurves have been obtained. The body's rotation period, pole and shape remain unknown.

Naming 

This minor planet is named after a common German female name. Any reference of this name to a person or occurrence is unknown.

Unknown meaning 

Among the many thousands of named minor planets, Alwine is one of 120 asteroids, for which no official naming citation has been published.

References

External links 
 Asteroid Lightcurve Database (LCDB), query form (info )
 Dictionary of Minor Planet Names, Google books
 Asteroids and comets rotation curves, CdR – Observatoire de Genève, Raoul Behrend
 Discovery Circumstances: Numbered Minor Planets (1)-(5000) – Minor Planet Center
 
 

001169
Discoveries by Max Wolf
Named minor planets
19300830